Len Fitzgerald (7 May 1929 – 17 April 2007) was an Australian rules footballer of exceptional talent in the Victorian Football League (VFL) and South Australian National Football League (SANFL). At various time he played in the key positions of centre half-forward, centre half-back and ruck-rover.

VFL career 
Fitzgerald started his career at Collingwood at the age of 15, in 1945.  By 1950 he was an established key player with arguably the country's most illustrious sporting club.

Move to SANFL 
It was thus surprising that in 1951 he was lured to the Sturt Football Club in the South Australian competition.

Fitzgerald was clearly attracted to the offer of better paying employment proffered by Sturt.  One source has suggested however that the move was engineered by Collingwood powerbroker John Wren at the behest of a political ally in South Australia.

SANFL career 
Arriving at Sturt in 1951, Fitzgerald quickly made an impression, being appointed captain after three games, and took over the coaching role mid-season.  In 1952 Fitzgerald dominated the League, winning his first Magarey Medal as the "fairest and most brilliant" player in the League. He was to win two more in 1954 and 1959.

Despite Fitzgerald's brilliance, Sturt was unable to secure a premiership.  In 1955 Fitzgerald got Sturt to the preliminary final, but the club failed to honour a promise of a bonus. Fitzgerald took himself to the Ovens and Murray League for the next three seasons, coaching and playing for Benalla.

When Fitzgerald returned to Sturt in 1959, he helped them to make the finals that year, the first time since his departure.  Injuries began to take their toll on his playing and Fitzgerald finished his playing career in 1962 after playing 127 games for Sturt, kicking 201 goals and winning the club's best and fairest award three times. He represented his adopted State of South Australia 20 times and was named an All Australian in the 1953 Adelaide Carnival.

Fitzgerald coached Glenelg for three seasons after his retirement as a player, but with little success.

He was inducted into the Australian Football Hall of Fame in 1996 and the SANFL Hall of Fame in 2002, as one of the inaugural inductees in each.

References

External links 

SANFL Hall of Fame

1929 births
2007 deaths
Collingwood Football Club players
Sturt Football Club players
Glenelg Football Club coaches
Sturt Football Club coaches
Australian Football Hall of Fame inductees
All-Australians (1953–1988)
Magarey Medal winners
Australian rules footballers from Victoria (Australia)
Benalla Football Club players
South Australian Football Hall of Fame inductees